The Shangri-la Cafe is a 2000 film written and directed by Lily Mariye. The film is about a Japanese American family who conceal their identity and reluctantly adopt discriminatory practices in order to operate a Chinese restaurant within the hostile cold war climate of Las Vegas in the late 1950s.

Cast
Montana Tsai as Annie Takashi
Joanne Takahashi as Emiko Takashi
Sam Anderson as The Man
Christopher Chen as Tad Takashi
Albert Chien as Jimmy Takashi
Cedric Harris as Reverend Charles Osteen
Montae Russell as George Brooks (as Monté Russell)
Margaret Laurena Kemp as Mildred Brooks
Kelli Kirkland  as Helen Osteen
Charles 'Brick' Tilley Jr.  as Man #2
Bob Bergen as Television Announcer (voice)

Reviews

“It’s an impressive directing debut for actress Lily Mariye.  Heartfelt and unusually sensitive to the heightened experience of children, “The Shangri-la Cafe” is a strong showcase for Mariye’s directing talents.  It deserves to be expanded into a feature.”
-Edward Guthmann, San Francisco Chronicle

"An extraordinary debut by a unique new voice in American filmmaking."  
-Jonathan Kaplan, Director, The Accused, Over the Edge

"... Lily is a director with vision."  -Anthony Edwards, Actor/Director

"A compelling and emotional story, superbly told, Lily Mariye has much to say and this is a powerful beginning"-Lesli Linka Glatter, Director, The Proposition, Now and Then, State of Emergency

"A stirring evocation of a very personal place and time, 'The Shangri-la Cafe' serves up a tender, bittersweet childhood recollection of a not always glittering Las Vegas past."-Michael Rechtshaffen, The Hollywood Reporter

Awards
National Organization for Women Filmmaker of the Year (Lily Mariye)
Best Short Film Award, Moondance International Film Festival
Best Screenplay Award, Brussels Independent Film Festival
2nd place, Best Short Film, Nashville Film Festival
2nd place, Best Short Film, Woodstock Film Festival

Official selection
BBC British Short Film (London)
Seattle International Film Festival
Palm Springs International Festival of Short Films
Hamptons International Film Festival
American Cinematheque at the Egyptian Theatre, Hollywood
Athens International
Sepia Women of Color (Kennedy Center, Washington D.C.)
Big Bear
Los Angeles Asian Pacific American Film and Video
New York Asian American International
San Francisco Asian American
Women of Color (Berkeley, CA)
Sedona Film Festival
Shades of Power (S.F., CA)
Chicago Asian American Showcase
San Diego Asian Film Festival
Slant (Houston, TX)
University of Iowa
Boston Museum of Fine Arts
Portobello Film (London)
Woodstock Film (NY)
Blue Sky International Film (Las Vegas)
Magnolia Festival
Yale Women in Film Festival

External links

2000 films
2000 drama films
2000 short films
American independent films
Films about Japanese Americans
2000s English-language films
2000s American films